The Fort Wayne TinCaps are a Minor League Baseball team of the Midwest League and the High-A affiliate of the San Diego Padres. They are located in Fort Wayne, Indiana, and play their home games at Parkview Field. They won their lone Midwest League championship in 2009.

History
In  the team moved to Keokuk, Iowa, where it spent five seasons as the Keokuk Cardinals; it was then based in Wisconsin Rapids, Wisconsin (–) and Kenosha, Wisconsin (–) before moving to Fort Wayne. When the team moved to Fort Wayne in 1993, it adopted a new name, the Wizards.

The name TinCaps was chosen following the 2008 season, alluding to John Chapman, better known as Johnny Appleseed (1774–1845). The Tin Cap refers to the story (dating back to the 19th century), that Johnny Appleseed wore a tin cooking pot as a hat, though this depiction has been disputed by historians. Chapman spent his final years in Fort Wayne and is buried in the city.

The team's home park was Memorial Stadium, opened in 1993; a franchise attendance record of 318,506 was also set that year. As part of the Harrison Square revitalization project, Parkview Field became the official home of the TinCaps at the start of the 2009 season. To coincide with the new ballpark, the team held a contest to determine a new name for the Wizards once that new ballpark opened, and "TinCaps" was the result.

The mascot of the TinCaps is Johnny TinCap. Previously, for the Wizards, it was Dinger the Dragon and prior to that, the Wizards were represented by Wayne the Wizard.

The team won the Midwest League 2009 championship by sweeping the Burlington Bees, 3–0. The first two games were played at Parkview Field and the final, decisive game was played in Burlington, Iowa. The team and its staff were honored at Parkview Field in a special victory rally on September 18, 2009. In addition to winning a franchise record-setting 94 games in their new home, fans shattered the previous attendance record for the season, with 378,529 coming through the turnstiles.

The TinCaps also clinched playoff spots in every season of Parkview Field's existence with the exception of 2016.

In conjunction with Major League Baseball's restructuring of Minor League Baseball in 2021, the TinCaps were organized into the High-A Central. In 2022, the High-A Central became known as the Midwest League, the name historically used by the regional circuit prior to the 2021 reorganization.

Playoffs

Awards and honors
2009 – Midwest League championship
2009 – MiLBY Awards "Overall Team of the Year"

All-time team
On August 24, 2008, The Journal Gazette and the franchise selected the all-time Wizards team members.

 Manager
Randy Ready
 Catcher
Javier Valentín
 First Baseman:
John Scheschuk
 Second Baseman:
Josh Barfield
 Third Baseman:
Sean Burroughs
 Shortstop:
Luis Rivas
 Designated Hitter:
Josh Loggins
 Outfielders:
Torii Hunter
Jeremy Owens
Will Venable
Kevin Reese
 Starting Pitchers:
Jake Peavy
LaTroy Hawkins
Tom Mott
Mike Ekstrom
Gabe Ribas
 Relief Pitchers:
J. J. Trujillo
Dale Thayer

Roster

Former TinCaps/Wizards in the majors

Dylan Axelrod,
Trea Turner,
Torii Hunter,
Jake Peavy,
Joakim Soria,
Nate Freiman,
David Freese,
Max Fried,
Will Venable,
Nick Hundley,
Matt Antonelli,
Josh Geer,
Josh Barfield,
A. J. Pierzynski,
Michael Cuddyer,
Wade LeBlanc,
Corey Koskie,
Dirk Hayhurst,
LaTroy Hawkins,
Matt Lawton,
Brandon Gomes,
Mat Latos,
Daniel Robertson,
Allan Dykstra,
Brad Brach,
Matt Wisler,
Corey Kluber, 
Dan Serafini,
Mike Hazen,
Miles Mikolas, and
Fernando Tatis Jr.

See also

History of sports in Fort Wayne, Indiana

Sources
 Dinda, J. (2003), "Fort Wayne, Indiana, in the Midwest League"
 TinCaps are champions  The Journal Gazette

References

External links

 
 Statistics from Baseball-Reference

Baseball teams established in 1993
Professional baseball teams in Indiana
Midwest League teams
Sports in Fort Wayne, Indiana
San Diego Padres minor league affiliates
1993 establishments in Indiana
Johnny Appleseed
High-A Central teams